Harrison Goddard (born 8 April 1998) is an Australian professional rugby union player of Aboriginal descent who plays for the LA Giltinis of Major League Rugby (MLR) in the United States. His position is scrum-half.

Goddard previously played scrum-half for the Melbourne Rebels in Super Rugby.

He made his debut for the Rebels against the Waratahs in a defeat for the Rebels.

Super Rugby statistics

References

External links
 Harrison Goddard - Rugby.com.au Profile

1998 births
Australian rugby union players
Rugby union scrum-halves
Melbourne Rebels players
Living people
Greater Sydney Rams players
Melbourne Rising players
Australian rugby sevens players
Australian expatriate rugby union players
Expatriate rugby union players in the United States
LA Giltinis players
People educated at Oakhill College
New South Wales Waratahs players